Dora Annie Dickens (16 August 1850 – 14 April 1851) was the infant daughter of English novelist Charles Dickens and his wife Catherine. She was the ninth of their ten children, and the youngest of their three daughters.

Life
Born at 1 Devonshire Terrace, Dora Dickens was named after the character Dora Spenlow, the child-bride of David Copperfield in Charles' 1850 novel David Copperfield. According to her oldest sister, Mary, on 14 April 1851 her father spent much of his time "playing with the children and carrying little Dora about the house and garden" of their Devonshire Terrace home. He then changed and went to the London Tavern for an annual dinner, at which he was to give a speech. Shortly before he spoke, his friend John Forster was called out of the room by one of Charles' servants, who came with the news that Dora had suddenly died after convulsions. He kept this from Charles until the speech was done.

"Half an hour before Charles rose to speak I had been called out of the room by one of the servants from Devonshire-terrace to tell me his child Dora was suddenly dead. She had not been strong from her birth; but there was just at this time no cause for special fear, when unexpected convulsions came, and the frail little life passed away. My decision had to be formed at once; and I satisfied myself that it would be best to permit his part of the proceedings to close before the truth was told to him. But as he went on, after the sentences I have quoted, to speak of actors having to come from scenes of sickness, of suffering, aye, even of death itself, to play their parts before us, my part was very difficult."

Impact on parents

Charles returned home. Mary later recalled, "I remember what a change seemed to have come over my dear father's face when we saw him again ... how pale and sad it looked." All that night he sat keeping watch over his daughter's body, supported by his friend Mark Lemon. The next day he wrote to his wife Catherine, who was recuperating at Malvern, Worcestershire. Anxious that news of death might further harm her health, he instead told of illness. Forster delivered the letter and later told her the truth. It read:

Devonshire Terrace, April 15, 1851

My Dearest Kate,

Now observe, you must read this letter very slowly and  carefully. If you have
hurried on thus far without quite understanding (apprehending some bad news)
I rely on your turning back and read again.

Little Dora, without being in the least pain, is suddenly stricken ill. She awoke out 
of a sleep, and was seen in one moment to be very ill. Mind! I will not deceive you. 
I think her "very" ill.

There is nothing in her appearance but perfect rest. You would suppose her quietly
asleep. But I am sure she is very ill, and I cannot encourage myself with much hope
of her recovery. I do not—and why should I say I do to you, my dear?—I do not 
think her recovery at all likely.

I do like to leave home, I can do no good here, but I think it right to stay. You will 
not like to be away, I know, and I cannot reconcile it to myself to keep you away. 
Forster, with his usual affection for us, comes down to bring you this letter and to 
bring you home, but I cannot close it without putting the strongest entreaty and 
injunction upon you to come with perfect composure—to remember what I have
often told you, that we never can expect to be exempt, as to our many children, 
from the afflictions of other parents, and that if,—if—when you come, I should
even have to say to you, "Our little baby is dead," you are to do your duty to the
rest, and to shew yourself worthy of the great trust you hold in them.

If you will read this steadily I have a perfect confidence in your doing what is right.

Ever affectionately, Charles Dickens

Catherine then "fell into a state of 'morbid' grief and suffering", recovering her composure after twelve hours or so. Charles retained his composure for some time. Mary recalled: "He did not break down until, an evening or two after her death, some beautiful flowers were sent ... He was about to take them upstairs and place them on the little dead baby, when he suddenly gave way completely."

Burial
Dora lies in Highgate Cemetery. Initially her coffin was placed in the catacombs whilst Charles sought a family plot. This took several years, for legal reasons. It was then found on a spot in view of London. The inscription reads "Dora Annie, the ninth child of Charles and Catherine Dickens, died 14th. April 1851, aged eight months."  On her own death in 1879, Catherine was buried with her. Charles and the other children were not.

See also
 Dickens family

References

External links
Dora Annie Dickens listed on the Internet Movie Database
Dora Dickens on 'Timeline of the Life of Charles Dickens'

Dora Dickens on 'Dickens Fast Facts'
Dora Dickens on 'Charles Dickens Timeline'
Dora Dickens on 'Charles Dickens Family And friends'
Dora Dickens on the 'Masterpiece Theatre' website

Charles Dickens
1850 births
1851 deaths
Burials at Highgate Cemetery
Child deaths